Peltidiidae is a family of copepods belonging to the order Harpacticoida.

Genera

Genera:
 Alteutha Baird, 1846
 Alteuthella Scott, 1909
 Alteuthellopsis Lang, 1948

References

Copepods